Once upon a Crime is a 1992 ensemble black comedy mystery film, starring Richard Lewis, John Candy, James Belushi, Cybill Shepherd, Sean Young and Ornella Muti. The film was directed by Eugene Levy. It is the remake of Mario Camerini's 1960 Italian comedy film Crimen.

Plot 
The plot revolves around a series of couples in Monte Carlo, Monaco. Augie Morosco (John Candy) is a reformed gambler whose wife Elena Morosco (Ornella Muti) (playing a similar character to her role in Oscar) is concluding a business deal, Neil Schwary (James Belushi) is a gambler looking to strike it big and whose wife Marilyn Schwary (Cybill Shepherd) is hoping to buy some designer clothes. Julian Peters (Richard Lewis) and Phoebe (Sean Young) met each other in Rome and are attempting to return a dachshund to the wealthy Madam Van Dougan.

Madam Van Dougan is found murdered and the interactions between Julian and Phoebe and the other couples begin to look increasingly suspicious, as Inspector Bonnard (Giancarlo Giannini) needs to unravel the clues. Over the course of the film, Augie returns to gambling, Elena has an affair and Julian sells and repurchases the dog.

Cast
 John Candy as Augie Morosco
 James Belushi as Neil Schwary
 Cybill Shepherd as Marilyn Schwary
 Sean Young as Phoebe
 Richard Lewis as Julian Peters
 Ornella Muti as Elena Morosco
 Giancarlo Giannini as Inspector Bonnard
 George Hamilton as Alfonso de la Pena
 Roberto Sbaratto as Detective Toussaint
 Joss Ackland as Hercules Popodopoulos
 Ann Way as Housekeeper
 Geoffrey Andrews as Butler
 Caterina Boratto as Madame de Senneville
 Elsa Martinelli as Carla the Agent
 Eugene Levy as Casino Cashier (uncredited)

Reception 
Janet Maslin of The New York Times said the film was not funny, and adding "As a general rule, films whose plots revolve around lost dogs are apt to be short on comic inspiration, and this one is no exception." 

The film was nominated for one Razzie Award, Worst Supporting Actress for Sean Young, where she lost to Estelle Getty in Stop! Or My Mom Will Shoot.

Inspirations 
In 2006, Abbas–Mustan known for directing thriller movies in Bollywood, adapted this movie as 36 China Town starring Shahid Kapoor and Kareena Kapoor. It is a frame-by-frame, shot-for-shot imitation of Once Upon a Crime.

References

External links 
 
 
 

1992 films
1992 comedy films
1990s black comedy films
1990s comedy mystery films
1992 directorial debut films
American black comedy films
American comedy mystery films
American remakes of Italian films
Films directed by Eugene Levy
Films produced by Dino De Laurentiis
Films scored by Richard Gibbs
Films set in Monaco
Films shot in Monaco
Films with screenplays by Nancy Meyers
Films with screenplays by Charles Shyer
Metro-Goldwyn-Mayer films
1990s English-language films
1990s American films
Films based on works by Luciano Vincenzoni